York Township is one of nine townships in DuPage County, Illinois, USA.  As of the 2010 census, its population was 123,449 and it contained 51,557 housing units.

Geography

Cities, towns, villages
 Downers Grove (partial)
 Elmhurst (vast majority)
 Glen Ellyn (east edge)
 Hinsdale (partial)
 Lombard (vast majority)
 Oak Brook (vast majority)
 Oakbrook Terrace
 Villa Park (vast majority)
 Westmont (north quarter)

Unincorporated towns
 Butterfield (Mostly in Milton Township)
 Fullersburg (Mostly in Downers Grove Township)
 Highland Hills at 
 South Addison at 
 South Elmhurst at 
 Utopia at 
 York Center at 
 Yorkfield at 
(This list is based on USGS data and may include former settlements.)

Cemeteries

Major highways
  Interstate 88
  Interstate 290
  Interstate 294
  Interstate 355
  U.S. Route 20
  Illinois Route 38
  Illinois Route 56
  Illinois Route 83

Airports and landing strips

 Chicago Bridge and Iron Heliport
 J W Scott Heliport
 Lombard Airport (historical)
 McDonalds Plaza Heliport
 Official Airline Guides Heliport
 Waste Management Inc Heliport

Lakes

 Lake Fred
 Mays Lake
 Teal Lake

Landmarks

 Elmhurst University
 Mammoth Spring

Demographics

School districts
 Elmhurst School District 205
 Westmont Community Unit School District 201
 DuPage High School District 88 (Willowbrook High School)

Political districts
 Illinois's 6th congressional district
 Illinois's 8th congressional district
 State House District 41
 State House District 42
 State House District 46
 State House District 47
 State Senate District 21
 State Senate District 23
 State Senate District 24

References
 
 United States Census Bureau 2008 TIGER/Line Shapefiles
 United States National Atlas

External links
 City-Data.com
 Illinois State Archives
 Township Officials of Illinois

Townships in DuPage County, Illinois
1849 establishments in Illinois
Townships in Illinois